Safa dan Marwah (Safa and Marwah)  is an Indonesian TV serial that was aired on RCTI. It was produced video productions house public distributor company network by SinemArt directed by Desiana Larasati.

Cast
 Nikita Willy — Safa
 Risty Tagor — Marwah and Renita (Dual role)
 Rionaldo Stockhorst — Ilham and Rizky (Dual role)
 Citra Kirana — Atikah
 Riza Shahab — Adil
 Christian Sugiono — Farid
 Melody Prima — Eva
 Bobby Joseph — Ello
 Mieke Amalia — Siti
 Umar Lubis — Husein, Zainal and Boy (triple role)
 Moudy Wilhelmina — Ratna
 Yadi Timo — Rajaf
 Cut Memey — Zalimah
 Inggrid Kansil — Ratih
 Riyanto RA — Fikri
 Epy Kusnandar — Kadir
 Fadly — Rudi
 El Manik — Kades
 Donna Harun — Dita
 Adjie Pangestu — Aji

Synopsis
Safa is a tomboy, yet beautiful girl. She is tough and very kind hearted. She lives with her mother, Siti, in a fishing village. Safa never realizes that Siti is not her real mother. All she knows is that she wants to help Siti to find her sister, Siti's daughter, who she misses dearly. Marwah on the other hand is a very gentle, beautiful, and religious rich girl. She is the typical girl whom every man adores. Marwah loves her family very much despite all their flaws. But she is not aware that actually they are not her biological family.

One day, Safa moves to Jakarta upon receiving her scholarship from a prestigious University. There she met Marwah, the idol of the whole campus. Friendship grows between them. Their closeness leads to Siti meeting Marwah in an occasion. The world beneath her feet trembles when Siti laid eyes on Marwah. Her motherly instinct kicks in, despite not knowing who Marwah actually is.

External links
 Safa dan Marwah

Indonesian television series
2009 Indonesian television series debuts